This World Science Fiction Convention (Worldcon) list includes prior and scheduled Worldcons, sorted by major city. The data is maintained by the Long List Committee, a World Science Fiction Society sub-committee.

External links
Official Worldcon Long List